100 Books by August Derleth is a bibliography of books by American author August Derleth. It was released in 1962 by Arkham House in an edition of 1,225 copies.  Approximately 200 copies of the edition were bound in pictorial boards for libraries (the edition in boards was issued without dustwrapper). The foreword is by Donald Wandrei.

The book includes two plates, one a frontispiece of Derleth in his office, the other of Derleth with his children, Walden William and April Rose. There is also an illustration reproducing a mock certificate awarding Derleth the degree of "Doctor of Philosophy in Mythos" to Derleth, from Miskatonic University.

Contents

 "Foreword" by Donald Wandrei
 Biographical
 Bibliographical
 A Checklist of Published Books
 Awaiting Publication
 Work in Progress
 Summary
 Recordings
 Compilations
 Anthologies / Textbooks
 Publications
 Films
 Lectures
 Appraisals
 From the Reviews
 Self-Appraisal

Reprints

Verona, WI:  E.V.A., 1974.

References

1962 non-fiction books
American non-fiction books
Published bibliographies
Arkham House books